Tooshin Dooi (Okinawan: 唐船どーい, Tooshin dooi) is a Ryukyuan folk song from the Okinawa Islands. It is one of the most popular eisa songs and is typically played at the end of Okinawan music festivals.

Background 
In the 14th century, the Ryukyuans became a tributary state of China, causing extensive trade to occur between the Ryukyu Kingdom and the Ming Dynasty. When Chinese ships would arrive in Okinawa to trade with the locals, the song "Tooshin Dooi" was often performed. Its English meaning is "A Chinese Ship is Coming".

Lyrics 

There are many variations of Tooshin Dooi.

See also 

 Ryukyuan music
 Okinawan music

References 

Okinawan music
Ryukyuan folk songs
Folk songs